is a Japanese football player currently playing for Shimizu S-Pulse.

Club statistics
Updated to 24 July 2022.

References

External links
Profile at FC Tokyo

1989 births
Living people
Association football people from Tokyo
Japanese footballers
J1 League players
J2 League players
Yokohama FC players
JEF United Chiba players
V-Varen Nagasaki players
FC Tokyo players
Sagan Tosu players
Shimizu S-Pulse players
Association football goalkeepers